The Townhouse is a Grade II listed building located in the city centre of Kingston upon Hull, East Riding of Yorkshire, England, built in 1846. Formerly a four star hotel, since September 2011, the building has been used as private student accommodation. Its primary residents are students at Hull University.

History
The Townhouse has been developed in one of Hull's finest buildings. Queen Victoria commissioned the building for her personal physician Sir James Alderson in 1846. Before it was converted into a hotel in 2006, it had been used as a nightclub.

Many features of the original building have been maintained, such as the sweeping staircase and ornate pillars. Modern new features include an Italian marble reception area.

References

Grade II listed buildings in the East Riding of Yorkshire
Hotel buildings completed in 1846
1846 establishments in England